Luís Barreira  (born 25 September 1968) is a Portuguese mathematician and a professor in the department of mathematics of Instituto Superior Técnico.

He is the author or coauthor of 13 books, many with Clàudia Valls, including among them Análise Complexa e Equações Diferenciais, Exercícios de Análise Complexa e Equações Diferenciais, Lyapunov Exponents and Smooth Ergodic Theory, Nonuniform Hyperbolicity, Stability of Nonautonomous Differential Equations, and Dimension and Recurrence in Hyperbolic Dynamics. He's also the author of several scientific articles, predominantly in Differential Equations, Dynamic Systems, Ergodic Theory and Multifractal Analysis.

Education 
Barreira got his degree in 1991 in Applied Mathematics and Computation, from Instituto Superior Técnico.

He got his PhD in 1996 at the University of Pennsylvania.

Awards 
Among his awards are:
 Prémio Gulbenkian Ciência, in 2007;
 Prémio Científico UTL/Santander Totta em Matemática, in 2007;
 Prémio Internacional Ferran Sunyer i Balaguer, in 2008;

References 

20th-century Portuguese mathematicians
University of Pennsylvania alumni
1968 births
Living people
Instituto Superior Técnico alumni
21st-century Portuguese mathematicians